Robert Lewis Howard (July 11, 1939 – December 23, 2009) was the most highly decorated officer of Vietnam United States Army Special Forces and Medal of Honor recipient of the Vietnam War.

He was wounded 14 times over 54 months of combat, was awarded the Medal of Honor, eight Purple Hearts, a Distinguished Service Cross, a Silver Star, and four Bronze Stars.

He was nominated for the Medal of Honor three times over a 13-month period but received lesser medals for the first two nominations, which were for actions performed in Cambodia where the U.S. was fighting covertly. He was awarded the Medal of Honor for his actions on December 30, 1968, his third nomination.

He retired from the US Army after 36 years of service as a full colonel. He was one of the most decorated soldiers in the Vietnam War and was "said to be the most decorated service member in the history of the United States".

He died as a result of pancreatic cancer, and was buried at Arlington National Cemetery on February 22, 2010.

Biography
Howard enlisted in the Army in 1956 at Montgomery, Alabama and retired as colonel, Army Special Forces, in 1992.

Howard's service in Vietnam included assignments with 1/327th Airborne Infantry,  1st Brigade, 101st Airborne Division, 5th Special Forces Group and MACV-SOG

As a staff sergeant of the highly classified Military Assistance Command, Vietnam – Studies and Observations Group (MACV-SOG), Howard was recommended for the Medal of Honor on three occasions for three individual actions during thirteen months spanning 1967–1968. The first two nominations were downgraded to a Silver Star and the Distinguished Service Cross due to the covert and top secret nature of the operations in which Howard participated.

As a sergeant first class of the SOG, he risked his life during a rescue mission in Cambodia on December 30, 1968, while second in command of a platoon-sized Hatchet Force that was searching for missing American soldier Robert Scherdin for which he was awarded the Medal of Honor. He learned of the award over a two-way radio while under enemy fire, immediately after being wounded, resulting in one of his eight Purple Hearts.

Howard was wounded 14 times during a 54-month period in the Vietnam War. For his distinguished service, Howard received a direct appointment from Master Sergeant to First Lieutenant in December 1969.

Howard graduated from Ranger School class 7-73 in May 1973 and served with the 2nd Ranger Battalion at Fort Lewis, Washington as company commander. From 1977 to 1978 he served as Mountain Ranger Training instructor.

Howard later served as officer-in-charge of Special Forces training at Camp Mackall, near Ft. Bragg, N.C., and later, commanding the Mountain Ranger Training Camp at Dahlonega, Georgia

Howard graduated from the National War College, Class 1987–1988.

He received two master's degrees during his Army career which spanned 1956 to 1992. Howard retired as a colonel in 1992.

He was one of the most decorated soldiers in the Vietnam War. NBC News said that Howard may have been the most highly decorated American soldier of the modern era, while KWTX-TV states that he was "said to be the most decorated service member in the history of the United States". John Plaster in his 1998 book SOG: The Secret Wars of America's Commandos in Vietnam states that Howard "remains to this day the most highly decorated American soldier."

His residence was in Texas and he spent much of his free time working with veterans until the time of his death. He also took periodic trips to Iraq to visit active duty troops.

Howard died of pancreatic cancer at a hospital in Waco, Texas, on December 23, 2009.  He was survived by four children and five grandchildren.

His funeral was in Arlington National Cemetery on February 22, 2010.

Legacy
In 2014, Howard was announced as the recipient of United States Special Operations Command's Bull Simons award for his "lifetime achievements in Special Operations".

In April 2017 a building at the Rowe Training Facility on Camp Mackall was named Howard Hall in his honor.

Medal of Honor Citation

Distinguished Service Cross Citation

Silver Star Citation

Awards and decorations

See also

List of Medal of Honor recipients for the Vietnam War
List of French Paratrooper Units

Notes

References

Further reading
Secret Commandos: Behind Enemy Lines with the Elite Warriors of SOG, by John Plaster

External links

1939 births
2009 deaths
Deaths from pancreatic cancer
Deaths from cancer in Texas
People from Opelika, Alabama
People from Waco, Texas
United States Army personnel of the Vietnam War
United States Army colonels
Members of the United States Army Special Forces
Recipients of the Air Medal
Recipients of the Legion of Merit
Recipients of the Silver Star
Recipients of the Distinguished Service Cross (United States)
United States Army Medal of Honor recipients
Recipients of the Gallantry Cross (Vietnam)
Recipients of the Defense Superior Service Medal
Burials at Arlington National Cemetery
Vietnam War recipients of the Medal of Honor
Military personnel from Texas